Gianluca Gaudino (born 11 November 1996) is a German professional footballer who plays as a midfielder for Swiss Super League club Lausanne-Sport.

Club career

Bayern Munich
Gaudino, is a youth product of the Bayern Munich Academy. He was promoted to the first team for the 2014–15 season after impressing Pep Guardiola. On 13 August 2014, he made his first-team debut in the German Supercup, playing the full 90 minutes as Bayern lost 2–0 against Borussia Dortmund. He made his league debut in the first match of the 2014–15 Bundesliga season as a starter against VfL Wolfsburg. Bayern won the match 2–1, and Gaudino became the fourth youngest debutant in the club's history. Gaudino made his Champions League debut on 10 December 2014 in a 3–0 home win against CSKA Moscow. For the 2015–16 season, he played for the reserve team where he made 19 appearances.

St. Gallen (loan)
Gaudino was loaned out to FC St. Gallen on 9 January 2016 until the end of the 2016–17 season.

Chievo
In June 2017, Gaudino joined Serie A side Chievo Verona. In August 2018, after having not been used frequently, Gaudino and the club agreed to mutually terminate his contract.

Young Boys
On 8 January 2019, Gaudino joined Swiss club Young Boys. Young Boys won the league on 12 April after FC Basel dropped points against Grasshoppers. In the 2019–20 Swiss Super League season, Gaudino became a key player in the Young Boys' journey to winning the Swiss double by playing a total of 34 games and scoring five goals to push them in winning the Swiss League for the third straight time and the Swiss Cup.

SV Sandhausen
On 9 June 2021, Gaudino returned to Germany where he joined 2. Bundesliga club SV Sandhausen. In Sandhausen, however, he failed to make an impact and was mainly a substitute. This was partly attributed to Gaudino being sidelined after being tested positive for COVID-19.

Rheindorf Altach (loan)
On 31 January 2022, Gaudino moved to Austrian club Rheindorf Altach on loan until the end of the season.

Lausanne-Sport
Gaudino joined Swiss Challenge League club Lausanne-Sport on 29 June 2022. The move reunited him with his manager at Rheindorf Altach, Ludovic Magnin.

Personal life
Gaudino was born in Hanau, Hesse, on 11 November 1996 and is the son of former German international midfielder Maurizio Gaudino.
He is eligible to play for either Germany or Italy due to his Italian paternal grandparents.

Career statistics

Honours
Bayern Munich
Bundesliga: 2014–15
DFL-Supercup: runner-up 2014

Young Boys
 Swiss Super League: 2018–19, 2019–20
 Swiss Cup: 2019–20

References

External links

1996 births
Living people
Sportspeople from Hanau
Association football midfielders
German sportspeople of Italian descent
German footballers
Germany youth international footballers
Bundesliga players
Regionalliga players
Swiss Super League players
Swiss 1. Liga (football) players
Serie A players
2. Bundesliga players
FC Bayern Munich footballers
FC Bayern Munich II players
FC St. Gallen players
A.C. ChievoVerona players
BSC Young Boys players
SV Sandhausen players
SC Rheindorf Altach players
FC Lausanne-Sport players
German expatriate footballers
Expatriate footballers in Switzerland
German expatriate sportspeople in Switzerland
Expatriate footballers in Italy
German expatriate sportspeople in Italy
Expatriate footballers in Austria
German expatriate sportspeople in Austria
Footballers from Hesse